Shoe Pavilion was an off-price footwear retailer based in Sherman Oaks, California.  At the time of its liquidation announcement, the chain had 116 stores throughout the Western and Southwestern areas of the United States.

Shoe Pavilion began liquidating its stores on October 20, 2008.

History
The company was founded in 1979 and was based in Sherman Oaks, California. It offered a selection of designer, label, and branded footwear, and accessories. Shoe Pavilion typically offered products at 20% to 60% below regular department store prices.

Bankruptcy
After five straight quarterly losses, the company filed for Chapter 11 bankruptcy. The shoe chain never recovered, and eventually won permission to liquidate all its remaining stores on October 20, 2008.

References

External links
TaoSneakers Website

Companies based in Los Angeles County, California
American companies established in 1979
Retail companies established in 1979
Retail companies disestablished in 2008
Footwear retailers of the United States
1979 establishments in California
2008 disestablishments in California